The 1928 Colorado Agricultural Aggies football team represented Colorado Agricultural College (now known as Colorado State University) in the Rocky Mountain Conference (RMC) during the 1928 college football season.  In their 19th season under head coach Harry W. Hughes, the Aggies compiled a 6–2 record, finished third in the RMC, and outscored all opponents by a total of 151 to 70.

Four Colorado Agricultural players received all-conference honors in 1928: center Carlyle Vickers, end Frank Prince, guard Ed Graves, and end Dan Beattie.

Schedule

References

Colorado Agricultural
Colorado State Rams football seasons
Colorado Agricultural Aggies football